The 1982 Atlantic hurricane season was an extremely inactive Atlantic hurricane season with five named tropical storms and one subtropical storm. Two storms became hurricanes, one of which reached major hurricane status. The season officially began on June 1, 1982, and lasted until November 30, 1982. These dates conventionally delimit the period of each year when most tropical cyclones form in the Atlantic basin. Activity started early with Hurricane Alberto forming on the first day of the season. Alberto threatened the Southwestern Florida coast as a tropical storm, meadering offshore in the southeastern Gulf of Mexico and causing 23 fatalities in Cuba. The next system, a subtropical storm, formed later in June and affected the same area as Alberto, causing $10 million in damage.

Tropical Storm Beryl formed on August 28, after a quiet July in the open Atlantic Ocean. Beryl grazed Cape Verde, killing 3 people. Tropical Depression Three formed just behind Beryl, tracking east and north of the Caribbean sea in early September. Soon after the dissipation of Beryl, Tropical Storm Chris formed in the Gulf of Mexico on September 9. Chris stayed a weak storm, making landfall near Sabine Pass, Texas, and dissipating over land on September 13. Hurricane Debby was the next storm and the strongest of the season. The formative stage of Debby produced rainfall in Puerto Rico and soon strengthened into a Category 4 Major Hurricane. Debby passed by Newfoundland on September 18 and merged with a non-tropical low on September 20. In mid-September, Tropical Depression Six formed west of Africa, and tracked west-northwest, dissipating before reaching the Leeward Islands on September 20. Its remnant thunderstorm activity continued moving west-northwest, forming Tropical Depression Seven which moved near Bermuda on September 25 before dissipating offshore Nova Scotia. The final storm of the season, Tropical Storm Ernesto, was the shortest-lasting system and stayed out to sea, dissipating on October 2.

Season summary 
The season was very inactive because of strong vertical wind shear due to stronger than normal westerly winds aloft. The wind shear was contributed by a variety of factors including a very strong El Niño. Vertical wind shear was strong enough to disrupt convection in areas of disturbed weather so they could not develop further. The El Niño which affected this hurricane season extended into the 1983 Atlantic hurricane season. Higher than average values of African mineral dust during the most active portion of the hurricane season could have also suppressed tropical cyclone activity.

The season's activity was reflected with a cumulative accumulated cyclone energy (ACE) rating of 32, which is classified as "below normal". ACE is, broadly speaking, a measure of the power of the hurricane multiplied by the length of time it existed, so storms that last a long time, as well as particularly strong hurricanes, have high ACEs. ACE is only calculated for full advisories on tropical systems at or exceeding 34 knots (39 mph, 63 km/h) or tropical storm strength. Although officially, subtropical cyclones are excluded from the total, the figure above includes periods when fully tropical storms were in a subtropical phase.

Systems

Hurricane Alberto 

On June 1, a tropical depression formed off western Cuba from an organized cloud system. It moved slowly northeastward through the Gulf of Mexico, and strengthened into Tropical Storm Alberto on June 3. Alberto traveled generally northeast on an erratic course, and briefly intensified to a Category 1 hurricane, one of the earliest hurricanes of June, and the earliest date for a hurricane in the Atlantic Ocean since Hurricane Alma in May 1970. Due to strengthening vertical wind shear, Alberto then quickly weakened into a tropical storm, doubled back to the west, and dissipated near the Florida Keys on June 6. Alberto is an example of a storm to enter the Gulf of Mexico and dissipating while never making landfall, which is an unusual event.

Though the storm never made landfall, 23 deaths were reported in Cuba from significant flooding, the worst in 32 years. Southern Florida experienced moderate rainfall, with a peak of  occurring in Tavernier.

Subtropical Storm One 

The first subtropical storm of the season formed in the east-central Gulf of Mexico on June 18, and moved northeast for its entire life cycle. It crossed the Florida peninsula that night, causing the issuance of numerous severe thunderstorm and tornado warnings. The cyclone also dropped heavy rainfall, peaking at  eight miles (13 km) southwest of DeSoto County, Florida. The storm continued, crossing the Outer Banks of North Carolina, and retained its strength until June 20 when it became extratropical near Newfoundland. The cyclone caused three deaths in Florida, sank a fishing trawler off the coast of North Carolina, and caused $10 million in damage (1982 USD). This was the only subtropical or tropical cyclone to impact the Eastern seaboard this season.

Tropical Storm Beryl 

A well-developed tropical wave exited Africa on August 27. The next day, it developed into a tropical depression, and shortly thereafter it intensified into Tropical Storm Beryl. On August 29, it passed just south of Cape Verde as it continued intensifying on its west-northwest track. An eye feature appeared in the convection on August 31, suggesting winds of near hurricane status; since the feature was located on the western side of the deep convection and the storm was slightly asymmetric, the intensity was held just below hurricane status. Shortly after, strong wind shear caused the storm to deteriorate, leaving the low-level circulation exposed on the western side. Beryl weakened to a tropical depression the next day due to the lack of convection, and it continued westward without redevelopment. The depression became disorganized once more and by September 6, it was no longer identifiable on satellites.

Early in its duration, Tropical Storm Beryl produced heavy rainfall and gusty winds on the Cape Verde island of Sal. The storm caused moderate damage across the archipelago, totaling $3 million (1982 USD). The passage of Beryl resulted in three casualties in Brava Island, as well as 122 injuries. In the period after the storm's passage, the United States provided humanitarian aid and economic assistance to the country, helping the archipelago to reverse the effects of Beryl.

Tropical Depression Three 

This system formed east of the Lesser Antilles on September 6 to the southeast of Tropical Storm Beryl in the tropical North Atlantic Ocean. The depression moved northeast of the Leeward Islands during the afternoon of September 7 while experiencing southwest vertical wind shear, and moved into the southwest North Atlantic before dissipating east of the Bahamas on September 9.

Tropical Storm Chris 

A surface low-pressure area developed on September 8 in the Gulf of Mexico. It drifted westward, and the next day it organized into a subtropical depression. Under the influence of a trough of low pressure, the depression turned northward, and after steadily becoming better organized it transitioned into Tropical Storm Chris by late on September 10. The storm attained peak winds of  before moving ashore near Sabine Pass in Texas. Chris continued inland until it dissipated over central Arkansas on September 13. Prior to making landfall, as many as 6,500 people evacuated from southern Louisiana, while offshore many oil workers were evacuated inland.

The rainfall caused locally severe flooding as far inland as Tennessee and Kentucky, with flooding of some rivers reported. The storm spawned nine tornadoes, of which four were F2 or stronger on the Fujita scale. Throughout its path, damage totaled $2 million (1982 USD).

Hurricane Debby 

A tropical wave moved westward offshore the coast of Africa. The wave traveled across the Atlantic, and organized into a tropical depression off the northern coast of the Dominican Republic on September 13. The depression turned north and strengthened into Tropical Storm Debby on September 14 and then a hurricane early the next day. Debby moved north-northeast, pass just east of Bermuda. Debby continued strengthening as it moved north, peaking as a Category 4 hurricane with maximum sustained winds of 130 mph (215 km/h).  The storm weakened significantly before passing to the southeast of Newfoundland on September 18, by which time Debby was a Category 2. The storm accelerated and began weakening over the colder waters of the north Atlantic. Debby became extratropical over the far north Atlantic and merged with a strong non-tropical system which was developing over British Isles on September 20.

Wind gusts on Bermuda approached 70 mph (110 km/h), leaving minor damage. Debby had little effect on Atlantic Canada, outside of heavy rainfall. Tropical storm-force winds were also recorded at Cape Race. A storm development related to Debby left two dead in Finland.

Tropical Depression Six 

Tropical Depression Seven 

The remnant area of disturbed weather from Tropical Depression Six continued moving west-northwest into the southwest north Atlantic. The system recurved off the north and northeast, dissipating in north Atlantic shipping lanes southeast of Nova Scotia on September 27.

Tropical Storm Ernesto 

A tropical wave emerged into the Atlantic from the west coast of Africa on September 23. The west side of the wave expanded and was designated Tropical Depression Eight on September 30. The depression intensified, making a sharp turn on October 1. However, on October 2, Ernesto rapidly weakened and by the next day, the cyclone became unidentifiable after merging with an extratropical low. Ernesto never approached land and caused no reported damage.

Storm names 
The following names were used for tropical storms that formed in the north Atlantic in 1982. This is the first time this name set was used since the post-1978 naming change, except for Florence and Helene which had been previously used in 1954, 1958, 1960, and 1964. No names were retired after this season, so all were used again in the 1988 season.

Season effects 
This is a table of the storms in 1982 and their landfall(s), if any. Deaths in parentheses are additional and indirect (an example of an indirect death would be a traffic accident), but are still storm-related. Damage and deaths include totals while the storm was extratropical or a wave or low.

|-
| Alberto ||  || bgcolor=#|Category 1 hurricane ||  ||  || Cuba, Florida ||  ||  || 
|-
| One ||  || bgcolor=#| ||  ||  || Southeastern United States, Atlantic Canada ||  ||  ||
|-
| Beryl ||  || bgcolor=#| ||  ||  || Cape Verde Islands ||  ||  ||
|-
| Three ||  || bgcolor=#| ||  ||  || None ||  ||  ||
|-
| Chris ||  || bgcolor=#| ||  ||  || Southern United States ||  ||  ||
|-
| Debby ||  || bgcolor=#|Category 4 hurricane ||  ||  || Puerto Rico, Hispaniola, Bermuda, Newfoundland ||  ||  ||
|-
| Six ||  || bgcolor=#| ||  || Unknown || None ||  ||  ||
|-
| Seven ||  || bgcolor=#| ||  ||  || None ||  ||  ||
|-
| Ernesto ||  || bgcolor=#| ||  ||  ||  ||  ||  ||
|-

See also 

 List of Atlantic hurricanes
 Atlantic hurricane season
 1982 Pacific hurricane season
 1982 Pacific typhoon season
 1982 North Indian Ocean cyclone season
 Australian cyclone seasons: 1981–82, 1982–83
 South Pacific cyclone seasons: 1981–82, 1982–83
 South-West Indian Ocean cyclone seasons: 1981–82, 1982–83
 Mediterranean tropical-like cyclone

References

External links 
 Monthly Weather Review

 
Atlantic hurricane seasons
Articles which contain graphical timelines
1982 ATL